El Cobre is a town in the Venezuelan Andean state of Táchira. The town is the shire town of the José María Vargas Municipality.

References

Populated places in Táchira